Holland Andrews is a gender-fluid singer, composer, performance artist, and clarinetist. Andrews, who uses they/them pronouns, is a solo artist and has previously performed under the name Like A Villain. Their style of music draws from contemporary opera, musical theater, jazz, ambient music and noise music. They also compose music for dance, theater, and film.

Andrews released three albums and two EPs, and they are known for their long, improvised live sets and cinematic music.

Early life
Raised in Los Angeles, California, Andrews comes from a family of singers that included their mother, sisters and cousins. Their mother and sister released the songs "What's Your Game" and "Running and Pushing" as the group MDLT.

Andrews' mother was troubled, suffering from schizoaffective disorder, as well as alcohol and drug abuse. When they were 3, their mother's boyfriend tried to drown them, and as a result, their mother lost custody. Andrews moved to Irvine, California to live with their father.

Their parents had been divorced for several years, when, at 16, their mother committed suicide.

Music career
Andrews moved to Portland, Oregon at 19, and joined the music community, playing clarinet and singing in the indie-folk bands Meyercord and The Ocean Floor. They began to perform as a solo artist, drawing on their childhood for their improvised music."

Under the moniker Like A Villain, their first album, The Life of a Gentleman, was self-released in 2010. Willamette Week described the music as "wall after wall of sound in choral blasts before switching to light, playful clarinet and snippets of spoken word."

In 2014, Andrews' house was robbed, including a computer with some of their early songs. However, they were able to still go ahead and independently release a second album of music, called Bast, that they recorded with Mike Erwin, and members of Typhoon, The Ocean Floor, Machinedrum, and others. They also began a residency to create a musical piece for the avant-garde Time-Based Art Festival, part of the Portland Institute for Contemporary Art.

Two years later, they secured a Creative Exchange Lab residency with PICA (Portland Institute For Contemporary Art). There, they met Dorothee Munyaneza, who they would eventually begin a collaboration. That same year, Andrews performed as a septet of artists in the Portland Jazz Composer's Ensemble. Their music and visual graphics focused on their work about trauma, and healing by music. The group included Andrews as composer and vocalist; Douglas Detrick, trumpet and music director; Reed Wallsmith, alto saxophone; Ian Christensen, tenor saxophone; Lars Campbell, trombone; Jon Shaw, bass; and Ken Ollis, drums.

After another performance with the Time-Based Art Festival, Andrews—again as Like A Villain—recorded their third album, What Makes Vulnerability Good at Color Therapy Recording Studio in Portland with Arjan Miranda before moving to New York City, New York to participate in the ISSUE Project Room 2020 residency program.  The album was released September 2019 on Accidental Records.

“We were thinking of ways that transform and keep the listener interested without sacrificing who I am as an artist,” they said about the use of synthesizer effects with arrangements that included guests like saxophonist Joe Cunningham (Blue Cranes). Lyrically, Andrews expounded on the relationship they had with their mother, among other personal topics.

In January 2021, under their own name for the first time, Andrews released the single and video, “Gloss”, followed by the Wordless EP in February.  They wrote, produced and mixed the EP themselves. Around the same period, to keep connected to fans during the isolation of the COVID-19 pandemic, they created There You Are, a series  of “microperformances” for their fans via telephone. There You Are was created as their final work for their artist residence program at ISSUE Project Room to supplement the online performances. These personalized performances were later a part of Darkness Sounding, a music festival organized by the Los Angeles ensemble, Wild Up.

Theater, film and dance
Andrews created music and performed in a collaboration with Rwandan-born refugee, singer/dancer/choreographer Dorothée Munyaneza called Unwanted. The work, which had its United States premier in 2017 at Baryshnikov Arts Center in New York City, was created from stories from refugees of Rwanda, Congo and other countries. These were stories of sexual violence used as a tool of warfare told by women who were survivors of genocide in their countries. It was set to electronic music by Alain Mahé. They performed the piece in October 2018 at Chicago's Museum of Contemporary Art.

In 2018, they performed as one of the vocalists in Gabriel Kahane’s Emergency Shelter Intake Form, a live piece of 13 vignettes with full orchestra that premiered at the Oregon Symphony. The concert, with theme of homelessness, was performed at the Jay Pritzker Pavilion in Millennium Park in Chicago, Illinois the following year.

Andrews created the music soundtrack for the 2019 documentary, Zero Impunity, a film that presents incidents of sexual violence in armed conflicts around the world.

In September 2020, Andrews along with other experimental musicians Justin Hicks and Alicia Hall Moran, provided the soundtrack for Lee Mingwei’s meditative performance installation, Our Labyrinth, at New York’s Metropolitan Museum of Art. Choreographed by Bill T. Jones, their music accompanies various dancers as they sweep mounds of rice around the floor in 90-minute intervals. That year, Andrews scored the music for Jones’ Afterwardsness dance piece, which was filmed at New York's Park Avenue Armory to lobby the State government for special permission to present reduced capacity, socially distanced performances due to COVID-19.

References

1988 births
Living people
Non-binary singers
Non-binary composers